Wildcat is a roller coaster manufactured by Anton Schwarzkopf currently operating at Jolly Roger Amusement Park in Ocean City, Maryland. The ride has also operated at other parks such as Cedar Point and Valleyfair.

History 
Over its lifetime, the roller coaster has been relocated three times, opening for the first time at Cedar Point in Sandusky, Ohio in 1970 as Wildcat. Then, after the 1978 season, it was relocated to Valleyfair! in Shakopee, Minnesota and opened for the 1979 season as Wild Rails. 20 years later, in 1999, the ride was relocated a second time to Jolly Roger Amusement Park, where it operated until 2001 when it was put into storage until 2015, when it reopened in a different section in the park.

Incidents 
On August 16, 2019, at around 8:20pm, one car failed to stop while entering the station, colliding with another car, injuring 5 people consisting of 4 children and 1 adult.

References 

Roller coasters operated by Cedar Fair